Mandalay International Airport, located 35 km south of Mandalay in Tada-U, is one of three international airports in Myanmar. Completed in 1999, it was the largest and most modern airport in the country until the modernization of Yangon International Airport in 2008. The airport connects 11 domestic and seven international destinations. Its  runway is the longest runway in use in Southeast Asia and has the capacity to handle up to 3 million passengers a year.

History
The Mandalay International Airport project was first conceived by the Burmese military government in the mid-1990s as a way to increase overall levels of foreign investment and tourism in Myanmar. With Yangon boasting the only other international airport in the whole country, the new Mandalay airport was regarded as crucial in achieving a planned 10% annual passenger growth. The hope was for Mandalay to become a hub for flights to other major Asian cities, in particular Beijing, Hanoi, Bangkok, Kolkata, and Dhaka.

On 16 November 2014, a consortium of Mitsubishi Group and an affiliate from Japan Airlines signed a concession agreement with the Myanmar government to operate the airport for 30 years. The joint firm undertook the operation, rehabilitation, and maintenance of airport facilities, including terminal buildings and the airport's sole runway, excluding air traffic control, with operations having begun around March 2015. The agreement's main focus is to generate further expansion of domestic and international flights to Mandalay and to increase passenger traffic through the airport.

Airlines and destinations

According to the official website, after the COVID-19 pandemic and the 2021 Myanmar coup d'état, the only international airlines operating from Mandalay are Myanmar Airways International, operating flights to Suvarnabhumi Airport and Thai AirAsia, operating flights to Don Mueang International Airport. Domestic airlines such as Myanmar National Airlines, Air KBZ, and Air Thanlwin are still operating domestic flights.

Airport facilities 
Opened on 17 September 2000, the terminal building can handle 1,000 passenger arrivals and 1,000 passenger departures per hour. The capacity of the airport is estimated to be 3 million passengers per annum, with an expansion capacity of more than 15 million.

The car park accommodates 700 vehicles.

The terminal is fitted with air conditioning, fire protection and emergency power generating systems. It is also equipped with six passenger lifts, one freight lift, three escalators, and a baggage handling system. Three out of the six-passenger boarding bridges can handle modern Boeing 747-8I aircraft. There is sufficient space for ten aircraft to anchor, and at a rate of 8 minutes per plane, aircraft of any size and make can touch down or take off to any destination abroad. MAGS (Mandalay Airport Ground Services) provides both passenger and cargo aircraft ground services.

Systems incorporated into the airport include VHF and HF SSB transmitters and receivers, a voice communication control system, an automatic terminal information system (ATIS), and an aeronautical fixed telecommunications network. The air traffic control tower is equipped with a variety of radar and navigation systems.

Passenger facilities
, these facilities exist at the airport:

36 check-in desks
8 gates
6 air-bridges
3 baggage claim belts
11 short-term parking spaces
6 long-term parking spaces
Post office and bank
Bureau de Change
Restaurants and VIP lounges
Duty-free facilities
Newsagent/tobacconist
Travel agency, tourist helpdesk and car rental

Statistics

Top destinations

Traffic by calendar year

Operator changes
Airport operations and maintenance are handled by a joint venture of Mitsubishi Corporation, JALUX Inc., and SPA Project Management Ltd., which won a bid in 2013 to upgrade and operate the airport for 30 years. The previous operator was Myanmar's Ministry of Transport. In August 2013, the vendor technical team started the inspection of the airport to develop an airport Master Plan that included airport services and cargo-handling areas as well as anticipating future needs such as extending the airport's buildings.

Incidents
On 12 May 2019, Myanmar National Airlines flight 103 from Yangon, carrying 82 passengers and seven crew, was approaching Mandalay International Airport when the front landing gear was unable to be extended. An emergency landing was conducted without the front landing gear. No injuries were sustained in this accident.

Gallery

See also

External links
 Mandalay International Airport Mjas MC-Jalux Airport Services Co., Ltd.

References

Buildings and structures in Mandalay
Mandalay
Airports in Myanmar
Airports established in 2000
2000 establishments in Myanmar